Adnan Likić (born 9 August 1986) is a Bosnian-Herzegovinian retired football player. He has played as a defender for NK Karlovac in the Croatia Prva HNL.

Club career
He later played for third tier OFK Gradina.

References

1986 births
Living people
Sportspeople from Tuzla
Association football defenders
Bosnia and Herzegovina footballers
FK Sloboda Tuzla players
Barcsi SC footballers
HNK Suhopolje players
HNK Šibenik players
NK Croatia Sesvete players
NK Karlovac players
OFK Gradina players
NK Vinogradar players
Premier League of Bosnia and Herzegovina players
Nemzeti Bajnokság II players
Croatian Football League players
First Football League (Croatia) players
First League of the Federation of Bosnia and Herzegovina players
Bosnia and Herzegovina expatriate footballers
Expatriate footballers in Croatia
Bosnia and Herzegovina expatriate sportspeople in Croatia
Expatriate footballers in Hungary
Bosnia and Herzegovina expatriate sportspeople in Hungary